Giulio Orlandini (active early 17th century) was an Italian painter active in his native Parma. He worked alongside Fortunato Gatti and Giovanni Maria Conti. He painted in the presbytery of the church of Santa Maria del Quartiere, Parma.

References

17th-century Italian painters
Italian male painters
Painters from Parma
Year of birth unknown
Year of death unknown